Haustrinae is a taxonomic subfamily of predatory sea snails, marine gastropod mollusks in the family Muricidae, the murex shells or rock shells.

The genera in this family were previously grouped in a larger subfamily, the Ocenebrinae.

Genera
Genera within the subfamily Haustrinae include:
 Bedeva Iredale, 1924
 Haustrum Perry, 1811 - synonyms: Lepsiella Iredale, 1912; Lepsithais Finlay, 1928
Genera brought into synonymy
 Lepsia Hutton, 1883: synonym of Haustrum Perry, 1811 (invalid: junior homonym of Lepsia Quoy, 1839 [Crustacea])
 Lepsiella Iredale, 1912: synonym of Haustrum  Perry, 1811 
 Lepsithais Finlay, 1928: synonym of Haustrum Perry, 1811 
 Otahua Marwick, 1948: synonym of Bedeva Iredale, 1924

References

External links

Ohio State University info

 
Muricidae